The Taurus Model 605 is a double-action/single-action, five-shot, snubnosed revolver chambered in .357 Magnum.  It is produced in both blued and stainless steel.  Some models feature an exposed hammer, that can be manually cocked in single action, while others are Double action only with bobbed hammer.  Like many Taurus revolvers, it features an integral keylock.  It was first introduced in 1995.

The primary use of this revolver is self-defense, based on its compact small-frame design. The 605 is built to the Taurus Zero Tolerance standard of quality including the Taurus lifetime warranty. The grip is rubber with a knubby pattern. In 1997 Taurus added the integral keylock that is engaged using a special key. The firing mechanism incorporates a transfer bar that assures the firing pin is not struck unless the trigger is pulled.

See also
 Taurus Model 85
 Taurus Model 731

References

External links
Taurus Model 605 Home Page

Taurus revolvers